The 2014 AT&T Major League Soccer All-Star Game was the 19th annual Major League Soccer All-Star Game. It took place on August 6, 2014 at Providence Park, the home of MLS club Portland Timbers. The game was televised live on ESPN2 and UniMás in the United States, TSN and RDS in Canada, and in more than 130 other countries worldwide.

Bayern Munich was the second European team from outside the United Kingdom to play in the All-Star Game, following Roma in the 2013 MLS All-Star Game, and the first German team to play in the All-Star Game. They were also the first defending FIFA Club World Champions to play in the All-Star Game after winning the 2013 FIFA Club World Cup.

The MLS All-Stars defeated Bayern Munich 2–1. After giving up a goal in the eighth minute to Robert Lewandowski, the All-Stars pulled even early in the second-half on a goal by Bradley Wright-Phillips. Landon Donovan scored in the 70th minute to put the All-Stars ahead permanently. Donovan was named the game's Most Valuable Player, and the next day, he announced that he would retire at the end of the 2014 MLS season.

The game featured many players who had seen action in the 2014 FIFA World Cup weeks earlier. On the MLS side, Clint Dempsey, Matt Besler, DeAndre Yedlin, Kyle Beckerman (United States) and Tim Cahill (Australia), among others, all got time on the pitch. Bayern saw contributions from Julian Green (USA), Javi Martínez (Spain), Dante (Brazil), Xherdan Shaqiri (Switzerland) and Arjen Robben (Netherlands). Most notably, Bayern's six members of the World Cup winning-German national team—Phillip Lahm, Manuel Neuer, Bastian Schweinsteiger, Thomas Müller, Mario Götze and Jérôme Boateng—all made appearances to much fanfare.

Following the conclusion of the game, an incident between Caleb Porter, the manager of the Portland Timbers and the MLS All-Stars, and Pep Guardiola, the manager of Bayern, drew headlines. Guardiola refused to shake hands with Porter following the match and the two exchanged words, with Guardiola walking off the pitch angrily.

Rosters

MLS All-Stars
As of August 6, 2014

Notes:
2014 MLS All-Star Fan XI.
Selected by All-Star coach Caleb Porter of the Portland Timbers.
Selected by MLS Commissioner Don Garber.
Injured or unable to play.
Replacement for player who is injured or unable to play, selected by coach Caleb Porter.

Bayern Munich

Notes:
Injured or unable to play.
FC Bayern Munich II
Bayern Munich Junior Team

Referee crew
On July 8, it was announced that PRO's Jair Marrufo would referee the match, with Claudiu Badea and Corey Parker assistant referees and Ismail Elfath the fourth official.

Match

Details

Aftermath
After the match, Bayern manager Pep Guardiola refused to shake the hand of MLS All-Stars manager Caleb Porter, despite Porter's multiple attempts. Guardiola seemed to be angry over rough challenges by MLS players during the exhibition match resulting in yellow cards, particularly those of Osvaldo Alonso and Will Johnson on Xherdan Shaqiri and Bastian Schweinsteiger respectively. Bayern Munich, in pre-season, had just arrived in the U.S. and had six players who played for Germany's World Cup-winning squad in July (although none started the game), whereas MLS players were halfway through the current season. Guardiola backtracked from his behavior post-game, stating, "We tried to play and we did. Congratulations to MLS for this victory. I hope they are going to invite us next year to try and make revenge and I hope to prepare a little bit better."

References

2014
FC Bayern Munich matches
Soccer in Oregon
All-Star Game
MLS All-Star Game
August 2014 sports events in the United States
Sports competitions in Portland, Oregon
2014 in sports in Oregon